Daniella Shevel is a New York-based, South African and American women's footwear designer and founder of the eponymous shoe brand.

Early life
Daniella was born in Johannesburg, South Africa. Her family moved to California when she was at 17 years old age, where she graduated from the University of Southern California.

Career
Daniella worked in digital marketing teams of Rag & Bone and Shopbop. Per her early childhood influence from Jimmy Choo and her passion for shoes, in 2018 founded her namesake brand. The designer has a flagship store in New York City's West Village neighborhood. Daniella's shoes are sourcing thicker heels, adding extra cushion to insoles, and choosing the softest and highest quality materials. All shoes are handcrafted in Brazil and Italy. Some of her square toe boots are reminiscent of the 90's along with snake skin patterns.

References

External links
Official website

Living people
2018 establishments in New York (state)
American companies established in 2018
Clothing companies established in 2018
Privately held companies based in New York City
People from Johannesburg
American people of South African descent
South African fashion designers
South African women fashion designers
Shoe designers
Shoe brands
Shoe companies of the United States
University of Southern California alumni
Year of birth missing (living people)